The Sunday Service of the Methodists (full title: The Sunday Service of the Methodists; With Other Occasional Services) is the first Christian liturgical book given to the Methodist Churches by their founder, John Wesley. It has its basis in the 1662 Book of Common Prayer. Editions were produced for Methodists in both the British Empire and in North America. Wesley published the first edition in 1784 as The Sunday Service of the Methodists in North America with Other Occasional Services.

The Sunday Service of the Methodists has immensely influenced later Methodist liturgical texts. The Order for Morning Prayer for the Methodist Episcopal Church, for example, was adapted from The Sunday Service of the Methodists. The more recent Book of Worship for Church and Home reprinted the original Morning Prayer office used in The Sunday Service of the Methodists. Many of the liturgical rites, such as that of the Lord's Supper, in "The Ritual" of The Discipline of The Allegheny Wesleyan Methodist Connection have preserved various prayers published in The Sunday Service of the Methodists.

See also 

Articles of Religion (Methodist)
Explanatory Notes Upon the New Testament
 Wesley's Covenant Renewal Service

References

External Links
The Sunday Service at Google Books.

Methodist texts